Donald Wilson was a South African footballer. He featured in a number of games for the South Africa national soccer team in 1947, scoring eleven times in nine appearances.

Career statistics

International

International goals
Scores and results list South Africa's goal tally first.

References

Date of birth unknown
Date of death unknown
South African soccer players
South Africa international soccer players
Association footballers not categorized by position